George Weed may refer to:

 George S. Weed (1862–1919), American lawyer and politician from New York
 George L. Weed (1857–1916), American politician from New York